Porta Susa is a Turin Metro station, located inside Porta Susa railway station.

It was built alongside the Line 1 XVIII Dicembre - Porta Nuova section opened on 5 October 2007, but remained inactive until Porta Susa railway station was inaugurated on 9 September 2011.

Services
 Ticket vending machines
 Handicap accessibility
 Elevators
 Escalators
 Connection with urban and suburban bus lines
 Active CCTV surveillance

References

Turin Metro stations
Railway stations opened in 2011
2011 establishments in Italy
Railway stations in Italy opened in the 21st century